Gottfried Honegger (12 June 1917 – 17 January 2016) was a Swiss artist and graphic designer. He was married to the Swiss illustrator Warja Lavater. He studied shop-window display at the Zurich Kunstgewerbeschule and taught there from 1948. His early work was commercial graphic design. 

From 1955 to 1958 he was art director at Geigy. 
He lived in New York City between 1958 and 1960, and held his first exhibition there.
In 1961 he moved to Paris and concentrated on painting, which concentrated on exacting explorations of circles and squares, and (from 1968), sculpture.  

Honegger also spent time in Dallas, Texas as the artist in residence at the University of Dallas. Honegger died at his home in Zürich, Switzerland from a short-illness on 17 January 2016, aged 98.

References

Sources
 Gottfried Honegger on artnet
 Gottfried Honegger by Museo Cantonale d’Arte von Lugano 

Swiss artists
Swiss graphic designers
Swiss expatriates in the United States
Swiss expatriates in France
University of Dallas faculty
1917 births
2016 deaths
Chevaliers of the Légion d'honneur
Commandeurs of the Ordre des Arts et des Lettres